TSB, or thiosymbescaline, is a series of lesser-known psychedelic drugs similar in structure to symbescaline. They were first synthesized by Alexander Shulgin and written up in his book PiHKAL (Phenethylamines i Have Known And Loved).  Very little is known about their dangers or toxicity.

TSB compounds

3-TSB
Dosage: unknown

Duration: unknown

Effects: few to none

4-TSB
Dosage: 240 mg

Duration: unknown

Effects: slight spaciness

See also 

 Phenethylamine
 Psychedelics, dissociatives and deliriants
 PiHKAL
 Mescaline
 Symbescaline

External links 
 3-TSB entry in PiHKAL
 3-TSB entry in PiHKAL • info 
 4-TSB entry in PiHKAL
 4-TSB entry in PiHKAL • info 

Psychedelic phenethylamines
Phenol ethers
Thioethers